This is a list of women writers who were born in Senegal or whose writings are closely associated with that country.

B
Mariama Bâ (1929–1981), French-language non-fiction writer, novelist, feminist
Sokhna Benga (born 1967), French-language novelist, poet
Jacqueline Fatima Bocoum (active since 2000s), French-language novelist, journalist
Ken Bugul (born 1947), French-language novelist

C
Aïssatou Cissé (born c.1970), novelist, political advisor

D
Nafissatou Niang Diallo (1941–1982), French-language novelist, autobiographer
Nafissatou Dia Diouf (born 1973), French-language short-story writer, novelist, children's writer
Aïssatou Diamanka-Besland (born 1972), French-language essayist, novelist, journalist
Mame Younousse Dieng (1939–2016), Wolof-language novelist, poet
Fatou Diome (born 1968), French-language novelist, short story writer

F
Khadi Fall (born 1948), novelist, former government minister
Kiné Kirama Fall (born 1934), French-language poet

H
Khady Hane (born 1962), French-language novelist, playwright

K
Aminata Maïga Ka (1950–2005), novelist

M
Annette Mbaye d'Erneville (born 1926), French-language poet, children's writer
Ndèye Coumba Mbengue Diakhaté (1924–2001), French-language poet, educator
Penda Mbow (born 1955), historian, non-fiction writer
Diana Mordasini (active since 1990s), journalist, novelist

N
Mariama Ndoye (born 1953),  French-language novelist, short story writer

S
Fama Diagne Sène (born 1969), French-language novelist, poet
Fatou Niang Siga (born 1932), French-language essayist
Aminata Sow Fall (born 1941), French-language novelist, consider the first published novelist from French Black Africa
Fatou Ndiaye Sow (1956–2004), poet, children's writer
Khady Sylla (1963–2013), novelist, short story writer, filmmaker

T
Rama Thiaw (born 1978), screenwriter
Myriam Warner-Vieyra (1939–2017), Guadeloupean-born Senegalese novelist, poet

Y
Rama Yade (born 1976), politician, non-fiction writer

-
Senegalese
Writers
Writers, women